is a Japanese anime television series created by Sunrise staff and manga artist Takehiko Itō. Produced by Sunrise, TV Tokyo and Dentsu, it is directed by Masami Shimoda, with Mayori Sekijima handling series scripts, Takehiko Itō and Akihiko Yamashita designing the characters and Ayako Ōtsuka composing the music. The series premiered in Japan on April 6, 2006 on TV Tokyo and later BS Japan and AT-X. On October 2, 2007, Bandai Entertainment released the first Region 1 volume of Zegapain with the last volume released on August 5, 2008. Following the 2012 closure of Bandai Entertainment, Sunrise announced at Otakon 2013, that Sentai Filmworks has rescued Zegapain, along with a handful of other former BEI titles. As part of the 10th anniversary of the series, a compilation theatrical film with new scenes, titled Zegapain Adaptation, was released in Japanese theaters on October 15, 2016.

Plot
Kyo Sogoru, a high school boy living in a city called Maihama, leads a normal life of school, romance, and the swim club. Kyo's life changes when he sees a beautiful girl, Shizuno Misaki, at the pool one day and discovers he is initially the only person who can see her. In order to keep his high school's swimming club open by recruiting more members, Kyo hopes to enlist Shizuno to appear in a promo video shot by Kyo's close friend, Ryoko. Shizuno agrees, but on the condition that he does something for her in exchange – pilot a mecha for an organization known as Cerebrum.

Agreeing to her request, Kyo is drawn into a world of fighting giant robots in a game-like world that he must save from Deutera Areas formed by aliens known as Gards-orm that threaten to destroy the earth. However, Kyo soon comes to realize that the world that he is living in might not even be real at all and begins to find that everything he is doing is strangely familiar. As he questions the nature of the reality he lives in, Kyo must continue to fight in order to protect the lives of those important to him.

Characters

Anime
The anime series was compiled and released on 9 DVD sets from 2006 to 2007.  The series was released on Blu-ray boxset in September 2010.

List of episodes

Video games

Two Xbox 360 games based on the anime have been released in Japan. The first, Zegapain XOR, was released in July 2006. The second, Zegapain NOT, a follow-up to Zegapain XOR, was released on December 7, 2006. Both titles were developed by Cavia and published by Bandai Namco Games.

The first game, published by Bandai, is called Zegapain XOR and was released in Japan on July 27, 2006. The game is similar in nature to Zone of the Enders. A mech action game, the player controls Cerebrant Toga Vital and the plot runs parallel to the events of the anime. Zegapain XOR is set on the Oceanus-class ship Dvaraka and commanded by Isola, a recurring character in the anime series. Several characters who appear in the game make brief appearances in the anime series.

A second game, titled Zegapain NOT, was released on December 7, 2006 in Japan. Also based on the anime series, Zegapain NOT is a sequel and companion to Zegapain XOR and continues the storyline of the previous game. The game features a special online mode that allows for cross-disc online play, enabling players with Zegapain XOR to play against players with Zegapain NOT. The game has over 3,000 ways to customize your character.

The main character is Toga Dupe, Toga Vital's lost character and memory data salvaged by Gards-orm, who controls the Anti-Zega Coatlicue. The story is set and told from the point of view of the Gards-orm, the antagonists to the heroes in the anime and Zegapain XOR.

Other media

Manga
The manga adaptation by Gou Yabuki, Zegapain Gaiden: AI AlWAYS, was serialized in the monthly magazine Dengeki Daioh from August 2006 to October 2006. A second manga based on the events of Zegapain XOR, Side-B N, appears on the official site for Zegapain XOR. It has nine chapters available for preview. Both were compiled into tankōbon format in Japan.

Radio drama
The radio drama Zegapain audio drama OUR LAST DAYS was released on October 25, 2006 in Japan.

Episode 1: "The Children of OCEANUS"
Episode 2: "entanglement 13.3"
Episode 3: "our last days"

Guidebooks
Zegapain Visual Fan Book, a guide recording the Zegapain material and plotline, was released on March 13, 2007 in Japan.  The guide features illustrations, articles on character, setting, and mechanics, conception of the story and how the setting was chosen, as well as staff interviews, which director Masami Shimoda and series creator Takehito Ito, and voice actors Shintaro Asanuma (Kyo) and Kana Hanazawa (Ryoko).

Another guidebook, Zegapain File Salvage, was released on November 10, 2010 in Japan.  Zegapain File Salvage includes information on creation and conception of the series's plot and setting, initial and final designs for characters and mecha, and exclusive illustrations by various artists. The guide also includes interviews by Shintaro Asanuma, Kana Hanazawa, Ayako Kawasumi (Shizuno); mecha designers Rei Nakahara, Sunrise DID, and Kozo Yokota; and staff members Masami Shimoda and Hiroyuki Hataike.

Novels
Two novels were written for Zegapain and are side-stories to the anime series and video games.  The first was published in June 2009 and features a recently awakened Cerebrant, Kurou Hayate, who finds Regina, a girl with an unusual meta-body, during an energy supply run aboard a Zega-tank; the story follows how they struggle to learn how they are irreplaceable even as data.  The second novel was published in December 2011 and focuses on Mao, a young man with amnesia, who finds himself fighting monsters in order to escape from a town in the desert and suddenly awakens as a Cerebrant.

See also

 Simulated reality in fiction

References

Further reading

External links
 

2006 anime television series debuts
Bandai Entertainment anime titles
Bandai Namco franchises
Dengeki Comics
Mecha anime and manga
Sentai Filmworks
Sunrise (company)
Anime with original screenplays
TV Tokyo original programming
Cyberpunk anime and manga
Shōnen manga